Lucky Day may refer to:

Music
 Lucky Day (album), a 2002 album by Shaggy, or the title song
 Lucky Day, an album by Jonathan Edwards

Songs
 "Lucky Day" (1926 song), a song written by De Sylva, Brown, and Henderson and recorded by Judy Garland (1956) and Ruth Olay (1959)
 "Lucky Day" (Nicola Roberts song)
 "Lucky Day" (Sasha song)
 "Lucky Day", a 1971 song by the Rascals from The Island of Real
 "Lucky Day", a song by Sasha from Greatest Hits
 "Lucky Day", a song by Thompson Twins from We Are Detective
 "Lucky Day", a song by Tom Waits from The Black Rider

Film and television
 A Lucky Day, a 2002 Argentine and Italian film by Sandra Gugliotta
 Lucky Day, a 2002 television film based on a story by Mary Higgins Clark
 Lucky Day (film), a 2019 film written and directed by Roger Avary
 Lucky Day, a character in Three Amigos

Other uses
 Lucky Day (lottery game), an Iowa state lottery game

See also 
 Lucky Daye (born 1985), an American singer-songwriter
 My Lucky Day (disambiguation)